College Township is a township in Centre County, Pennsylvania. It is part of the State College, Pennsylvania metropolitan statistical area. The population was 10,780 at the 2020 census, which was a 13.2% increase from the 2010 census. College Township was formed on November 25, 1875, from Howard Township.

College Township is served by the State College Area School District for K-12 education and the Alpha Fire Company for fire protection. The Alpha Fire Company maintains one of its two substations in the College Township Municipal Building.

Pennsylvania State University is partially in College Township.

History
Two major Native American archaeological sites are located in College Township. Known as the Tudek and Houserville sites, they were used during the Archaic period for the quarrying and reduction of stone tools made of jasper.  Both sites are listed on the National Register of Historic Places.

Geography
Mount Nittany is a prominent and well-known feature in the township.

College Township is bordered by Ferguson Township to the west, Patton Township to the northwest, Benner Township to the north, Harris Township to the south, and east, and the borough of State College to the south and west.

Demographics

As of a 2015 census estimate, the township was 89.9% Non-Hispanic White, 4.3% Black or African American, 1.2% Native American Alaska Native, 4.8% Asian, 0.3% Some other race, and 2.1% were Two or More Races. Hispanics and Latinos (of any race) were 1.1% of the population.

Government
College Township is part of Pennsylvania's 12th congressional district, represented by Republican Fred Keller, elected in 2019.

References

External links
College Township official website

Populated places established in 1800
Townships in Centre County, Pennsylvania
Townships in Pennsylvania